The KS-30 is a Soviet 130mm anti-aircraft gun that appeared in the early 1950s, closely resembling the German wartime 12.8 cm FlaK 40 anti-aircraft gun. The KS-30 was used for the home defense forces of the USSR and some other Warsaw Pact countries. Recognition features are the heavy dual-tire carriage, a firing platform which folds up to a 45 degree angle when the piece is in travel, and the long clean tube without a muzzle brake. The breechblock is of the semi-automatic horizontal sliding-wedge type, and the piece is fitted with a power rammer and an automatic fuze setter. Fire control is provided by the PUAZO-30 director and the SON-30 radar. The ammunition is of the fixed-charge, separated type. It is not interchangeable with that of the 130 mm field guns or the WWII-era naval and coastal guns, but the cartridge case is the same as in 130 mm/58 (5.1") SM-2-1 (Soviet) and Type 76 (Chinese) naval guns as well as in SM-4-1 coastal gun. The KS-30 is now held in war reserve since it was replaced by surface-to-air guided missiles.

Comparable weapons
12.8 cm FlaK 40 - Nazi Germany
120 mm M1 gun - United States

See also

100 mm air defense gun KS-19 - contemporary and complementary weapons system
85 mm air defense gun M1939 (52-K) - previous generation Soviet AA-gun, much more known
152 mm air defense gun KM-52 - 152 mm anti-aircraft gun developed from the KS-30

References

Anti-aircraft guns of the Soviet Union
130 mm artillery
Military equipment introduced in the 1950s